Girchi is a liberal and libertarian political party in Georgia. It emphasizes economic liberalism and fiscal conservatism, and describes itself as "a pro-Western, centrist party — culturally liberal and fiscally conservative — created to promote democratic values", and a supporter of Atlanticism and pro-Europeanism. In regards to the COVID-19 pandemic in Georgia, it promises to lift COVID-19-related restrictions, while calling on everyone to observe hygienic norms. Girchi supports more private sector involvement in both healthcare and environment protection, advocating for deregulation and the removal of prohibition laws that protects the environment but that according to the party have the opposite effect.

The party was established in November 2015 after four lawmakers (Zurab Japaridze, Pavle Kublashvili, Goga Khachidze, and Giorgi Meladze) quit the right-leaning former ruling and then-parliamentary minority party United National Movement. Chaired by Iago Khvichia, Girchi promotes itself as being open to youth willing to participate in politics. It is the first Georgian online party that rejected a standard party structure and methods of political struggle by selecting Facebook as the main hub of its activities and as a platform of communication. From August to September, Girchi was briefly a part of Paata Burchuladze's State for the People election bloc which they quit just eleven days before the 2016 Georgian parliamentary election, citing "serious problems in terms of management". In December 2020, it underwent a split with the formation of Girchi – More Freedom.

History

Foundation and growth 
The origins of Girchi date back to May 2015 when four members of Parliament, Zurab Japaridze, Pavle Kublashvili, Goga Khachidze, and Giorgi Meladze, left the United National Movement to establish what they called a "new and open political center meant to attract and engage professionals in the political process". The MPs' departure from UNM was seen as the first major division of what was at the time the largest opposition party in Parliament, with Japaridze (who served until his departure as Executive Secretary of UNM) criticizing the party for "failing to renew itself and win back the public's confidence", hinting at the continued influence of former President Mikheil Saakashvili in the organization's internal affairs. Within the first months of its creation, Girchi became one of the best-funded parties in Georgia, surpassing the fundraising numbers of even the ruling Georgian Dream party.

Girchi sought to position itself as a new political force in Georgia, opposing both Georgian Dream and the United National Movement by proposing a libertarian political ideology rooted in drastic spending cuts and tax reductions. It also received criticism from both of those parties, with UNM purchasing the Girchi.ge domain name before the party could register it officially. It opened its first office in Kutaisi (then-political capital of Georgia) on 5 November 2015 and was officially registered as a political party on 16 April 2016. Its first chairman was Zurab Japaridze.

To increase its political perspectives, Girchi joined forces during the 2016 parliamentary election with other center-right parties, including New Georgia and New Rights, forming the New Choice coalition. That electoral bloc eventually joined the State for the People coalition, a well-financed bloc led by opera singer Paata Burchuladze, with Japaridze calling for "common ground" between pro-Western political parties. The SFP bloc's campaign platform was centered around promoting individual and economic liberties and a pro-Western foreign policy. Though Girchi had five of its nominees included in the bloc's electoral list, it withdrew from the coalition two weeks before Election Day and removed its nominees from SFP's list after Japaridze accused the bloc of "blackmailing" the party. Despite abstaining from the 2016 election and losing its four MPs whose terms ended that year, Girchi vowed to stay active and fight for its ideology. Pavle Kublashvili, one of Girchi's founding MPs, left the party and politics shortly after the election.

The party refused to take part in the 2017 local elections, protesting what it claimed was fraudulent submissions of party registration petition signatures by other political organizations. In an example of political satire, the party submitted 28,000 fake petition signatures, which the Central Election Commission claimed to have verified all in one day. In 2018, Zurab Japaridze was the party's nominee for President of Georgia, while libertarian attorney Iago Khvichia became the party's chairman. Throughout the presidential election, Japaridze ran on a platform he would call "More Freedom" and pledged to challenge the "centers of political power", including the Georgian Orthodox Church, the banking system, the Government of Georgia, and the political opposition. Japaridze was the first candidate nominated by Girchi independently and won 2.3% of the vote, ending in sixth position out of 25 presidential candidates, while his results among the Georgian diaspora were considerably stronger, reaching 5.7%. Japaridze refused to endorse either Salome Zourabichvili or Grigol Vashadze in the subsequent runoffs. In the post-electoral State Audit of party financing, Girchi refused to submit its records, arguing that Georgian Dream had violated electoral law by facilitating the clearing of private debts to hundreds of thousands of voters days before the election. Girchi's electoral result improved during the 2019 special parliamentary election in Mtatsminda, with party nominee Herman Szabo receiving 4.8% of the votes.

Girchi distinguished itself with its activism, both popular and legal, to promote libertarian principles. In July 2018, Zurab Japaridze and fellow Girchi official Vakhtang Megrelishvili filed a lawsuit against Article 45 of the Administrative Code which made cannabis possession and consumption a criminal offense, arguing its incompatibility with the Georgian Constitution's 16th Article. The lawsuit led to the Constitutional Court declaring unconstitutional all sanctions for the use and possession of recreational cannabis, effectively making Georgia the first post-Soviet republic to legalize marijuana, a result that was largely criticized by the government and the Georgian Orthodox Church. In November 2018, a group of Girchi activists made headlines by pulling down their pants in front of Russian military forces stationed in South Ossetia, which led to the criticism of the State Security Service's director Grigol Liluashvili, who said of the activists that "none of them have served in the army, for a Georgian man would not have pulled his pants down and shown his backside to the enemy."

Zurab Japaridze and other party activists would be regularly arrested over the years, including during the 2018 Georgian protests calling for drug policy reform and the 2019 demonstrations in favor of electoral reform. In October 2018, the party organized the Cannabis Festival in Tbilisi which would be broken up by the police. Several other party activists would be arrested in April 2020 when they held a brief rally against COVID-related restrictions despite the public lockdown.

During the political crisis of 2019–2020, Girchi coalesced with other opposition parties and took part in joint opposition negotiations mediated by the Labour Party over a common strategy to challenge the government. As such, it was a party to the 8 March 2020 agreement between the opposition and the government, which led to partial electoral reform but eventually failed over President Zourabichvili's refusal to pardon opposition activist Giorgi Rurua. In the 2020 parliamentary election, the party fielded its own electoral list and its own nominees in Batumi, Poti, Rustavi, and Khashuri, although it was one of 30 opposition signatories to an agreement that created an "anti-Georgian Dream electoral coalition", while Japaridze was endorsed by other opposition parties as nominee for the Didube-Chughureti parliamentary district. Girchi also led a campaign to convince other opposition parties to sign on various libertarian pledges, including judicial, law enforcement, economic, and educational reforms. The party organized several acts of protests during the 2020 elections, including by unsuccessfully seeking a Constitutional Court ruling against gender-based electoral quotas and by pledging to raffle off Tesla cars to its voters in an attempt to criticize the public funding of political parties.

Girchi won 2.9% of the vote in 2020, becoming the third most popular party in Tbilisi and winning four parliamentary seats. However, it originally refused to recognize the electoral results and joined the boycottof majoritarian runoffs announced by the other opposition parties.

Split and parliamentary party 

In the aftermath of the 2020 election and under the leadership of Zurab Japaridze, Girchi strongly supported the boycott of the 10th Convocation of Parliament and the large-scale protests organized in opposition to Georgian Dream's victory, with Japaridze openly calling for repeat elections. On 3 November, the party was one of 19 to sign a declaration of intent to renounce their parliamentary mandates. However, Japaridze announced his departure from the party on 4 December over internal struggles that Radio Free Europe/Radio Liberty called "not unexpected". Many observers linked Japaridze's exit to controversial comments made by party chairman Khvichia against criminal prosecution for individuals watching illegal video footage, although Japaridze denied those to comments as the cause of the party's split. Reports eventually revealed long-standing conflicts within the party over some of its leaders' management style, while the party would evaluate the departure of its founder as a "victory against one-man rule of political parties in Georgia." Zurab Japaridze would create a new libertarian party, Girchi – More Freedom, while the original party was largely led by Iago Khvichia and Vakhtang Megrelishvili.

Following Japaridze's departure, Girchi walked back its pledge to renounce its parliamentary mandates, instead openly supporting negotiations with the government. The party became known as a "less radical" opposition group that sought an alliance with the Citizens party to reach a deal with Georgian Dream over new parliamentary elections if the ruling party were to receive less votes in the 2021 local elections than in 2020, a proposal originally brushed off by most opposition parties but eventually incorporated into the 19 April 2021 Agreement that brought an end to the boycott, that was negotiated by European Council President Charles Michel, and which was first signed by Girchi itself. When the government cancelled the 19 April deal weeks later, Girchi leaders remained in Parliament, refusing the call by other opposition parties to resume their boycott.

Girchi fielded no mayoral nominees in the 2021 local elections, instead fielding lists for the proportional Municipal Assembly races. Its results collapsed under 1% and experts have linked the fall in the party's support to the establishment of a new party by Japaridze and the lack of media coverage that came with having no mayoral nominee. The party managed to win one seat in the Abasha Municipal Assembly.

Girchi currently holds four seats in Parliament and is represented by Iago Khvichia, Vakhtang Megrelishvili, Sandro Rakviashvili, and Herman Szabo. As a parliamentary party, it caucuses with the opposition and has stated its main priority was electoral reform, backing a fully-proportional, no-threshold election in 2024. Khvichia was elected to the Prosecutorial Council of Georgia in 2021 and was a failed candidate for the position of Public Defender in 2022. On 11 March 2023, Girchi organized a large-scale public protest against government attempts to expand military conscription.

Name and symbols 

The party's name Girchi is Georgian for conifer cone (გირჩი), a name that carries several symbolic meanings. In the first place, the Nordmann fir is a species endemic to the South Caucasus, making pine cones a common sight to Georgia. In addition, conifer cones have traditionally been associated with resurrection and new energy (representing the pineal gland in ancient Egypt, enlightenment in Assyria, illumination in the Christian world), which ties in with the party's positioning as an innovative new force in Georgian politics.

Girchi's logo is a dark green conifer cone and has become one of the most well-recognized political logos in the Georgian political scene. Wordless stickers featuring the logo can be found across the streets of Tbilisi, as party activists regularly choose them instead of more traditional campaign banners during electoral periods. The party's electoral number was 36 during the 2020 parliamentary and 2021 local elections, which is regularly featured in party literature. The party also carries a flag featuring its logo.

Upon its creation, the party was officially registered as "New Political Center – Girchi", showcasing the party's claim to be a centrist new political party. Since 2020, it has been registered only as "Girchi". It should not be confused with another libertarian political party called "Girchi – More Freedom", created in 2021. The latter was created by Girchi's original founder Zurab Japaridze, who legally changed his name in 2018 to "Zurab Girchi Japaridze".

Structure and composition

Constitution 
Girchi's governing document is its constitution, which was drafted by a constitutional group and adopted in 2021. The document is described as a "public declaration of values and a contract between citizens." Defining the party's main values, including individual liberty, private property, absolute free speech, and contractual rights, it outlines its opposition to the state as a "violent organization that can only be justified to prevent further violence". The document prohibits party members from supporting measures that "restrict individual freedoms". Its preamble states: 

Girchi's constitution outlines a system of conflict resolution between party members, a clause that was seen as necessary after the party's 2020 split. Amendments to the document can be proposed by the Governing Council, or by joint decision of the party's King and High Priest, and need to be approved through a majority vote of GeD shareholders.

The constitution outlines elections for seats on the party's Governing Council and for placement on its proportional electoral list, through the 1 GeD = 1 vote formula. All votes are held online. This system is unique for the Georgian political spectrum, with national parties traditionally characterized by low levels of intra-party democracy.

Governing council 

Girchi is led by the party's chairman (Iago Khvichia since 2018) and the Governing Council, a decision-making body in place since 2019 and made of 16 members (five politicians elected through internal elections, the five highest GeD holders, and the six largest donors over the six months preceding the council's election). The council is elected "within adequate time" of every parliamentary and local election.

Since the 2020 split, the party's governing documents provide for a "King" and a "High Priest" to administer the organization "in cases of emergency", a tongue-in-cheek system that has never been used but is meant to provide an alternative if the Governing Council is in deadlock. Formally, the "King" of Girchi is MP Herman Szabo, while the High Priest is the head of the Church of Biblical Freedom, Levan Jgerenaia. If this measure is activated, the two are supposed to make joint decisions that are not subject to appeal and that are binding for every party member. The two positions are lifetime appointments, while the party's Constitution provides for their abolition "after long and successful reigns."

Georgian Dollar 
The Georgian dollar (signed GeD) is a cryptocurrency emitted by Girchi as a "political currency", the purchase of which implies support for the legalization of cannabis and for a multi-currency regime, as well as recognition of the party's constitution as a binding document. The currency claims to be backed by "both tangible and intangible assets", including state funding of political parties, while its security relies on its transparency, all transactions being public and downloadable. Girchi has asserted that if it were to come to power, it would use the cryptocurrency as a tool to privatize public property across the population.

The GeD's value is established at 0.01 USD, which is set to remain the same as long as the party remains in the opposition. Its total circulation is scheduled to be 50 billion units, while 2.9% has been emitted as of March 2023. GeD holders have the right to request refunds, while each GeD allows an individual one vote in internal party business, including primary and governing council elections.

Church of Biblical Freedom 
In March 2017, Girchi created the Christian, Evangelical, Protestant Church of Georgia, also known as the Church of Biblical Freedom. Its purpose was to use a military conscription loopholes allowing people to evade service if in a religious position. The Church has since then been officially registered with the Ministry of Justice and claims having helped close to 50,000 young men avoid conscription (although the Ministry of Defense has disputed those numbers and estimated 12,000 conscription evaders only). While some have argued that the entity was not a legitimate religion, some its leaders have argued that it falls within the definition of an established religion and holds a concrete faith that can be associated with Christian anarchism. Individuals that seek to be ordained as priests of the Biblical Freedom Church are asked to donate 50 lari to the organization.

Its first "High Priest" was Nikoloz Oboladze. The current Church leader is Levan Jgerenaia ("Levan I").

Despite receiving legal recognition, public authorities have been highly critical of its activities. Former Parliament Speaker Archil Talakvadze called it a "threat to national security", while Defense and Security Committee chairman Irakli Sesiashvili called its actions "wrong and unjustifiable". As Minister of Defense, Irakli Gharibashvili called the Church a "disaster" and pledged to curtail it. Several opposition groups, including the United National Movement and European Georgia, have backed its existence and the use of the legal loophole. In April 2018, the pro-Russian Alliance of Patriots introduced a bill backed by the majority that would have banned insults to religion and was meant to target Girchi's religious arm. In April 2017, the Agency of Religious Affairs requested a list of personal data of its clergymen, a move that was condemned by civil society. Georgian Dream would eventually pass a bill reforming military conscription by criminalizing evasion through "forms of deception", although the requirements did not directly impact Girchi. In March 2023, the Parliament is considering a bill that would close the religious loophole for conscription, except for members of the Georgian Orthodox Church.

In February 2021, the Holy Synod of the Georgian Orthodox Church denied communions, baptism, marriage, and funeral rights to those who had been ordained as priests of the Biblical Freedom Church, a move that proved controversial. In 2019, the Girchi organization issued an anathema against then-Justice Minister Tea Tsulukiani and Public Development Agency Director Soso Giorgadze for their attempts to close down the church.

Ideology and positioning 
Girchi is a classical liberal and libertarian political party that centers its ideology on economic and social liberalism and fiscal conservatism. It is a strictly minarchist party that calls itself pro-Western, Atlanticist, and pro-European. Sometimes described in national news media as a "right-wing" or "right-libertarian" party, it advocates for the abolition of income, profit, and import taxes and supports drastic cuts in public spending, most notably by abolishing entire ministries. It has also been called a "youth-based right-wing party" with a central focus on drug policy reform. Several of the positions it has pioneered, including the legalization of cannabis, have become widespread due to national developments, such as the White Noise Movement. Because of the perceived lack in ideological differences between traditional political parties in Georgia, Girchi was described upon its foundation as the "fist political party based on a proper ideology".

Some political analysts have observed that the party's original name, "New Political Center", had little to do centrism as an ideology, instead being an attempt by the organization to position itself as an alternative to the two largest parties dominating Georgian politics, Georgian Dream (GD) and the United National Movement (UNM). Girchi has regularly been the target of criticism by both sides, with Georgian Dream successive chairmen Bidzina Ivanishvili and Irakli Kobakhidze calling it a "satellite" of UNM in 2016 and 2020 respectively, while other parties have alleged secretive ties between Girchi and Georgian Dream. In 2016, State for the People claimed that Girchi's then-leader Zurab Japaridze was seeking financial help from the ruling GD, while UNM alleged in 2020 that Girchi would seek to form a coalition with GD following the legislative elections of that year.

Girchi has denied any ties with other political parties and was a signatory of a 30-party agreement in 2020 that pledged a joint strategy against the government. In Parliament, it caucuses with the parliamentary opposition. In April 2022, party chairman Iago Khvichia was quoted as saying that "no one is left in the world that thinks everything is in order in Georgia in terms of democracy," indicating his strong disapproval of GD's governance. However, seeking to distance itself from UNM, it refused to endorse the prime ministerial bid of former President Mikheil Saakashvili in 2020, with party leadership calling him a "power-hungry man", while Khvichia would call on Saakashvili to apologize publicly for human rights violations during his presidency and to abandon politics. Khvichia also visited Saakashvili since the latter's detention, obtaining from the former head of state a statement denying ties between Girchi and GD, while Khvichia called for his release. The party has backed the idea of establishing an investigative commission on Saakashvili's treatment in prison. In February 2023, Khvichia called UNM a party "in the midst of self-destruction", referring to the latter's decision to boycott parliamentary activities.

Analysts have noted a shift in approach towards the political spectrum since the exit of Zurab Japaridze in the party, the remaining leadership favoring compromise and dialogue with the authorities while the split party GMF has aligned itself with other opposition parties and has promoted more radical ideas of "revolution" and public protests. As such, it was one of few parties to agree to join legislative working groups set up to adopt reforms in line with the European Commission's recommendations in 2022, although criticizing GD's decision to exclude some non-governmental organizations. Some of its MPs voted in 2021 for the election of GD's Shalva Papuashvili as Speaker of Parliament. On August 4, 2022, it co-authored a declaration with the liberal Citizens party, calling for the withdrawal of Mikheil Saakashvili from politics and the return of GD's Bidzina Ivanishvili as Prime Minister.

Throughout the 2020-2021 political crisis, Girchi stood out as backing direct negotiations with the authorities to end the impasse that was created following the declaration of a parliamentary boycott by the opposition in protest of alleged voter fraud, an allegation that the party distanced itself from after Japaridze's split. While originally positioning itself as a potential mediator between the various parties, it also proposed GD a deal in which it would end its own boycott in exchange for legislative reform either on the electoral system, cannabis legalization, multi-currency regime, school choice, or decentralization of law enforcement. While that deal was not finalized, Girchi proposed a way out of the crisis by making the 2021 local elections a referendum on potential repeat legislative polls, an idea originally rejected but eventually included in the European Union-negotiated political agreement signed by the parties on April 19, 2021.

In Parliament, Girchi has often associated itself with the Citizens party and has been one of the political groups most likely to reject the remaining opposition's calls for boycotts and protests. It rejected a 2021 proposal by Lelo for Georgia to form a shadow opposition coalition government and has said at times that European Georgia, another self-proclaimed liberal party, would be violent if it came to power. It has consistently refused to endorse candidates of other parties, even though GMF has regularly formed electoral coalitions with small parties. Girchi supports holding a primary for opposition parties to field candidates in 2024.

Size and influence

2018 presidential performance 

The only presidential campaign that has coincided with the existence of Girchi is the 2018 race in which the party's nominee was Zurab Japaridze. The latter was selected unanimously by party leaders and announced his candidacy on April 16. As a presidential candidate, he pledged to abolish military conscription, pardon people serving drug-related prison sentences, hold ministerial meetings streamed on social media platforms, veto "every bill that limits freedom", and double defense spending by 2024.

Japaridze's campaign efforts were notable for their unorthodox and innovative strategies, many of which were done in an attempt to gather media attention. He legally changed his name to become "Zurab Girchi Japaridze". His party posted ads on the pornographic website PornHub, while his campaign refused monetary donations. He reportedly raised only 33 GEL throughout his campaign, although he largely relied on non-monetary contributions. Most of his activity was done online, focusing on younger audiences through social media platforms. Days before the election, Japaridze hosted the Tbilisi Cannabis Festival, an act of civil disobedience, which resulted in his arrest.

Though he was excluded from most opinion polls, Zurab Japaridze polled 2-5% when his name was listed among presidential candidates. He ultimately won 2.26% (36,034 votes), finishing in sixth place and then refusing to endorse anyone in the runoffs.

Girchi's results were the strongest in the wealthiest neighborhoods of Tbilisi, including Vake (8.6%), Saburtalo (7.3%), Mtatsminda (7.1%), and Didube (7%), districts where he ended in third place. Japaridze also did considerably better among Georgians living abroad, winning 5.7% and finishing in fourth place. On the other hand, his lowest scores were in districts with a minority-majority population, winning less than 0.3% in Akhalkalaki, Marneuli, Ninotsminda, Khulo, Dmanisi, and Bolnisi. He also won less than 1% of the vote in several regions, including Samegrelo-Zemo Svaneti.

Parliamentary results 

The first parliamentary election Girchi took part in was the June 2019 special election for the Mtatsminda Majoritarian District, in which the party nominated young media manager Herman Szabó. That race was one of the most crowded in Georgian legislative election history, with 20 candidates throwing their hats in the race, while Girchi sought to build on the support it had won during the preceding presidential election. Continuing at the time the civil disobedience-based campaigns the party became known for, Girchi encouraged party members to register to vote in the district despite warnings by the Ministry of Justice. It also suggested it would openly bribe voters through GeD grants, in protest of alleged voter bribery by Georgian Dream during preceding elections. Szabó would win 4.8% (701 votes) of the vote in that election, finishing fourth.

During the 2020 parliamentary election, Girchi was one of few parties to declare an open contest for intra-party primaries to select names for its proportional electoral list. The primary was done online and candidates were selected by party members based on the 1 GeD = 1 vote principle. However, the party was forced to modify its list due to gender-based quota requirements imposed during the 2020 electoral reform push. Zurab Japaridze, Iago Khvichia, Vakhtang Megrelishvili, Aleksandre Rakviashvili, and Herman Szabó were selected to lead the party list through the primary. While the party originally said it would not field any majoritarian candidate and would refuse to be part of an opposition coalition, it eventually agreed to field Zurab Japaridze as candidate for the Didube-Chughureti Majoritarian District with the endorsement of almost every opposition party, while not nominating candidates where other parties agreed to field joint nominees. Because the opposition only agreed on candidates in Tbilisi, Girchi also nominated candidates in Rustavi-Gardabani (Vakhtang Megrelishvili), Khashuri (Nika Mosiashvili), Poti (Boris Kurua), Guria (Vakhtang Zenaishvili), and Batumi (Iago Khvichia).

During the 2020 campaign, Girchi refused campaign donations and spent no direct funds. Instead, it largely focused on social media marketing, while majoritarian candidates mostly targeted their advertisement to people under 35 years old. It consistently polled 1-4%. Ultimately, it won 2.9% (55,598 votes), obtaining four parliamentary seats. Its best results were seen in Tbilisi, where the party won third place behind Georgian Dream and the United National Movement.

Nationwide, its best score was in Tbilisi's Vake (9.1%), Saburtalo (8.1%), Didube-Chughureti (8%), Mtatsminda-Krtsanisi and Nadzaladevi (6.4%), Gldani (5.4%), and Isani (5%) districts. In a repeat of the 2018 presidential results, Girchi's poorest performance was seen in minority-majority districts, including Akhalkalaki-Ninotsminda (0.1%), Marneuli-Gardabani (0.2%), Bolnisi-Dmanisi-Tsalka-Tetritsqaro (0.6%), and High Adjara (0.7%). It also continued to underperform in the regions of Samegrelo-Zemo Svaneti, Racha-Lechkhumi-Kvemo Svaneti, and Imereti.

In the 2020 polls, Girchi won 8.1% of the vote among the Georgian diaspora, finishing in third place in that electorate. It came out in second place among Georgian voters in the Czech Republic (where it defeated Georgian Dream), Germany, and Austria.

In the majoritarian districts where it fielded candidates, Girchi mostly underperformed its nationwide results, with the exception of Megrelishvili's 3.3% in Rustavi-Gardabani and Japaridze's 21.1% in Didube-Chughureti.

Local elections 

Girchi refused to participate in the 2017 local elections, protesting what it deemed unfair party qualification requirements. It also did not field any candidate in the various special local races that have taken place in 2018, 2019, 2020, and 2022.

During the nationwide local elections of 2021, Girchi rejected fielding any mayoral nominee, nor did it have any candidate for majoritarian seats on Municipal Assemblies. Instead, it chose to focus on proportional elections and argued that the party's main goal was "preservation and progress". The campaign headquarters were led by party activist Oto Zakalashvili, while Herman Szabó headed the party's Tbilisi list. The party had no proportional list in 13 municipalities.

The party won 0.95% (16,695 votes), a 70% drop from its 2020 legislative results. Its best results were in Abasha (3.3%), Lentekhi (3%) and Tbilisi's Vake district (2.1%). The party blamed its poor results on nationwide developments, including the rise of a new opposition party led by former Prime Minister Giorgi Gakharia and the return to Georgia of former President Mikheil Saakashvili. However, analysts have linked the sharp fall in support to the party's split, most libertarian-leaning voters choosing to support Zurab Japaridze's GMF, at the time a part of the united opposition's coalition. Some also blame the poor showing to the lack of mayoral nominee, leading to a loss in potential media coverage.

In 2021, Girchi won one seat on the Abasha Municipal Assembly.

Membership 
Girchi considers holders of its cryptocurrency, the Georgian dollar, as party members. As of March 2023, the party counted 2,880 such members.

The party has been known to target mostly young voters through "witty, at times controversial PR campaigns", according to Civil Georgia. Its communication methods are mostly based on social media platforms, especially Facebook, for communicating, fundraising, and to enroll new members. Georgian magazine The Messenger has described the party's campaigns as "never ceasing to surprise the public and the country's political establishment."

Girchi members in office 
Upon its creation in 2015, Girchi included four members of Parliament that had previously been elected under the UNM ticket (Japaridze, Kublashvili, Khachidze, and Meladze). Though parliamentary procedures prevented them from creating a separate faction, they mostly worked in coordination during the 8th Parliamentary Convocation (2012-2016) to push for libertarian legislation. In March 2016, MP Japaridze proposed an amendment to the Military Obligation and Service Act that would have abolished conscription, although the bill failed in committee due to opposition by Georgian Dream and the Ministry of Internal Affairs. Another bill proposed in November 2016 would have repealed Article 45 of the Code of Administrative Offenses, effectively legalizing cannabis in Georgia, although the bill was never considered before the convocation's term ended. In May 2016, MP Goga Khachidze proposed a series of amendments to the Code of Administrative Offenses and the Police Act that banned law enforcement's discretionary power to require drug testing. The bill came in response to the death of a civilian that had been forced to take diuretic pills to undergo drug testing and eventually became the party's sole legislative success.

While the party held no elected office from 2016 to 2020, Girchi won four seats in the 2020 parliamentary elections. However, one of the four elected MPs was Zurab Japaridze, who left the party in December 2020, leaving Girchi with only three MPs - Iago Khvichia, Vakhtang Megrelishvili, and Salome Mujiri. The latter resigned in May 2021 in protest of the gender-based electoral quotas that had required one quarter of the party's candidates to be women and was replaced by Alexandre Rakviashvili. Japaridze himself resigned from Parliament in November 2021, allowing Girchi to fill his seat with Herman Szabó.

Following the adoption of new parliamentary procedures that lowered the threshold for Political Group membership from four to two MPs, the Girchi Political Group in Parliament was created on June 11, 2021, chaired by Iago Khvichia and including three members at first. Szabó joined the Group upon entering Parliament. The group has largely worked in unanimity, proposing libertarian legislation that has so far failed in the 10th Parliamentary Convocation, including a bill that would have allowed retired veterans and law enforcement officers to own firearms, a proposal to create a fact-finding commission on the National Bank of Georgia, and a property tax exemption for those earning less than 70,000 GEL a year. In February 2022, the party proposed a bill that would have exempted party-appointed District Election Commission members from holding "election administration certificates", a requirement that has proven burdensome for small parties.

Besides members of Parliament, Girchi holds one seat on the Prosecutorial Council of Georgia, the body overseeing the State Prosecutor's Office, following the election of Iago Khvichia on April 13, 2022, by Parliament under opposition quota. The party also holds one seat on the Abasha Municipal Assembly, Koki Chachava (who already served in 2017-2021 as a deputy from SFP).

Activism

Planting of cannabis on government premises 
In the beginning of November 2016, Girchi put forward an ultimatum to the Georgian authorities threatening to plant, along with of-age supporters, cannabis seeds on Girchi party premises if the government refused to change the existing drug policy, including the legalisation of cannabis and cannabis related products. On 31 December, Girchi and volunteer supporters (totalling 84 individuals) publicly planted cannabis seeds. The process was aired live by the Georgian TV networks and live-streamed on Facebook by Girchi and social media channels. Although the planting/cultivation of cannabis is punishable under the current Criminal Code of Georgia and stipulates a maximum penalty of 12-years imprisonment the government made the decision not to charge the participants of this act of civil disobedience. An investigation on the matter was conducted and the police confiscated 84 plant pots containing cannabis seeds for laboratory tests. Citing a low level of THC in the plants, the police closed the investigation. One of the leaders of the party, Zurab Girchi Japaridze, was presented with administrative charges and fined as an organiser.

Legal efforts to legalise cannabis possession and consumption 

On 30 November 2017, the Constitutional Court of Georgia decriminalised the personal consumption of cannabis and other cannabis-based products. The decision came in a case brought by a citizen, Givi Shanidze, who wished to have his criminal record for repeated cannabis use erased. The plaintiff was represented by the Chairman of Girchi, Iago Khvichia. While affirming the right to consume cannabis, the Court's decision stated its potential health risks and did not legalise the sale, distribution, or production of cannabis. With the Court's decision, criminal charges for cannabis use were deemed to be in violation of Article 16 of the previous redaction of the Constitution of Georgia (Article 12 of the 2017 Constitution) which enshrines every individual's right to free development of their personality. However, the decision only applied to criminal penalties and did not end the possibility of a fine or other administrative sanctions for consumption of cannabis.

On 30 July 2018, the Constitutional Court of Georgia released the second decision on the matter of cannabis consumption which was prompted by a lawsuit filed by the leaders of the Girchi party, Vakhtang Megrelishvili and Zurab Girchi Japaridze, effectively abolishing administrative punishment for the use of the drug. According to the applicants:

The consumption of cannabis is not an act that threatens society. In particular, it can only harm the users' health, making that user him/herself responsible for the outcome. The responsibility for such actions does not cause dangerous consequences for the public.

The Constitutional Court of Georgia noted that giving legal permission to consume cannabis protects an individual's right to free development of his/her personality, and while prohibition of the consumption of cannabis is an action directed against its turnover and therefore serves the aim of consumer protection of health, according to the Court, the role of an individual user in the support of cannabis circulation is very small, and consequently the threats from individual consumption are likewise small. Due to the above-mentioned, the court ruled the punishment for consumption of cannabis to be disproportionate. The court took into account certain exceptions in cases when the use of cannabis might create threats to third parties and stated:

In addition, the Constitutional Court highlights the imposition of responsibility of cannabis consumption when it creates a threat to third parties. For instance, the Court will justify responsibility when cannabis is consumed in educational institutions, public places, such as on public transport, and in the presence of children.

Georgia is the first former soviet country where the consumption of cannabis is legal.

Shmaxi 
On 1 October 2019, new taxi market regulations entered into force in Tbilisi, Georgia. According to the new laws, the holders of a "category A license" have the legal right to pick-up passengers as long as their cars are white, have 4 doors, a trunk and are left-hand drive vehicles. Additionally, the vehicles must have undergone and passed mandatory technical inspections and have a sign stating "Taxi Tbilisi".

Girchi founded a new educational initiative and registered a company "Shmaxi" with the Ministry of Justice of Georgia. Shmaxi employs those who have recently lost their jobs as a result of the new regulations and any interested individuals.

To circumvent the law, Shmaxi will hire these former taxi drivers as not drivers but as teachers called shmaxists.  Their role will be to educate their passengers on the ideals of freedom and liberty and will provide for viewing relevant video/audio content, including lectures of Milton Friedman, during the journey. This is the service passengers are going to be charged for. The price will be calculated according to the length of lectures, not the distance covered by the Shmaxi.

As of October 2019, Shmaxi employs more than 500 shmaxists.

2017 local elections 
Girchi became the first political party in Georgia to organise the public collection of signatures to register for the 2017 local elections through a special on-line application platform.

Political parties functioning in Georgia have been pretending to collect the 25,000 genuine signatures necessary to register for participation in the elections. In reality, they have been copying data from the Central Election Commission/CEC database into the application forms designated by the commission. This documentation is then presented to the CEC, which registers a political party for elections.

Girchi rejected this tradition of forging supporters’ signatures and announced that it would participate in the elections only if it collected 25,000 on-line signatures of exclusively genuine supporters. In less than one month, Girchi managed to collect 7,200 signatures, which was not enough to take part in the elections.

Lotto civil disobedience 
Since 2009, according to Georgian legislation, conducting lottery activities in Georgia is the sole domain of one company – Georgian National Lottery According to Girchi, giving a monopoly to one company is unfair, immoral, economically unjustified and poses questions related to the existence of corruption. To protest this state of affairs, in July 2018 Girchi members carried out an act of civil disobedience on the party's premises and, in breach of existing legislation, played lotto for money. This was accompanied by live coverage. There was no reaction from law-enforcement agencies, which proved once again how absurd the legislation prohibiting citizens to play lotto or organise a lottery is.

Cannabis Legalisation Festival 
On 20 October 2018, one week before the presidential election, Girchi and its activists held the Cannabis Legalisation Festival in Tbilisi, protesting the new aim of Parliament to pass a bill restricting the consumption of cannabis. The event was not green-lighted by the authorities, and police prevented organisers from actually holding the festival. Nevertheless, Zurab Girchi Japaridze publicly handed out cannabis joints to certain individuals, hence, committed another act of civil disobedience by breaking Article 273(1) of the Criminal Code of Georgia. Zurab Girchi Japaridze was eventually detained along with several other participants who protested for the legalisation of Cannabis consumption at the festival.

Based on Girchi's statements, the Ministry of Internal Affairs of Georgia launched an investigation under the 2nd and 8th Paragraphs of Article 273 (1) of the Criminal Code of Georgia on the illegal possession, use and trade of cannabis or cannabis-related products . However, no formal charges were presented and Zurab Girchi Japaridze and the other detainees were released the same day.

Girchi TV 

Girchi TV started broadcasting on 21 August 2019. One of the leaders of the party Zurab Girchi Japaridze, explained that they want to reach a segment of the Georgian population that still receives political information from television and not from the Internet.

According to the representatives of the party, their new channel will not pay taxes until their debt reaches 24,984,000 GEL since other leading Channels had the debt of somewhat similar amount annulled by the Government of Georgia. According to the party Georgian Broadcasters use two different methods to avoid taxes: either working for the Government, in which case they are simply exempt from their obligations, or the opposition, so that when the State attacks the latter the society perceives it as a fight against the freedom of speech.

Girchi Brothel Pioneer 
In 2019, just one week before the mid-term parliamentary elections which Girchi participated in, Girchi opened a brothel in its headquarters.

With this act of civil disobedience Girchi addressed the arrest of 3 individuals on charges of promoting prostitution and opposed relevant Georgian criminal legislation, that has become a source of arbitrary justice on many occasions in Georgia. As a result of such Government actions people who support themselves and their families through selling sexual services and who have not harmed anyone, are left without any financial means. They additionally suffer public reproach, since the social stigma associated with being a sex service provider is deeply rooted in Georgian society.

Girchi believes that, whether to engage in any job/activity that does not involve elements of physical or psychological violence should be subject to the discretion of freely consenting adults. Following this line of reasoning, Girchi believes that prostitution is a fair and acceptable occupation.

Girchi states that the only path towards ending this situation and, consequently, protecting people involved in the sex-industry from violence and abuse, coming mainly from the law enforcement agencies, is the legalisation of prostitution. According to Girchi, the full legalisation would also benefit society at large through preventing the spread of AIDS/HIV among other sexually transmitted diseases.

With this act of civil disobedience Girchi staff violated paragraph 3 of Article 254 of the Criminal Code of Georgia (Promotion of Prostitution) which states that:

Making available an area or dwelling place for prostitution committed jointly by more than one person shall be punished by imprisonment for a term of three to six years.

Purchase of bio-drugs 
Throughout years, Girchi has protested against current drug policies. One of the issues that Girchi continuously underlines is that existing prohibitions and punishments prescribed by legislation for drug-related offences are of financial interest for some individuals. While it is very difficult to obtain cannabis which grows wildly in almost all regions of Georgia, it is very easy to purchase other drugs of dubious origin and composition. These reach Georgia from abroad, having had to cross customs borders.

To illustrate this state of affairs, on 24 February 2017 Girchi undertook a so-called bio-drug purchase, shooting a video depicting all details of the process. It was completed in under an hour. The documentary was distributed to the public as well as media companies. The drugs obtained were then submitted to the police in accordance with relevant procedures. Through this act, Girchi intended to demonstrate how accessible bio-drugs are in Georgia, including for under-age citizens, and how false were the claims by the Ministry of Internal Affairs that the current repressive regime on narcotics has any positive effect.

See also 
 Girchi – More Freedom — a party split from Girchi

References 

2015 establishments in Georgia (country)
Liberal parties in Georgia (country)
Libertarian parties in Georgia (country)
Centre-right parties in Georgia (country)
Political parties established in 2015
Political parties in Georgia (country)
Pro-European political parties in Georgia (country)